The North Dakota oil boom refers to the period of rapidly expanding oil extraction from the Bakken Formation in the state of North Dakota that lasted from the discovery of Parshall Oil Field in 2006, and peaked in 2012, but with substantially less growth noted since 2015 due to a global decline in oil prices. Despite the Great Recession, the oil boom resulted in enough jobs to provide North Dakota with the lowest unemployment rate in the United States from 2008 to at least 2014. The boom gave North Dakota, a state with a 2013 population of about 725,000, a billion-dollar budget surplus. North Dakota, which ranked 38th in per capita gross domestic product (GDP) in 2001, rose steadily with the Bakken boom, and had a per capita GDP 29% above the national average by 2013.

By October 2020, total oil rig count in the state had fallen dramatically. According to the North Dakota Department of Mineral Resources, the total oil rig count in the state had fallen from 58 active rigs on October 3, 2019, to only 11 active rigs on October 3, 2020, a reduction of over 80 percent.

The oil boom was largely due to the successful use of horizontal drilling and hydraulic fracturing, which made unconventional tight oil deposits recoverable. Contributing to the boom was a push to commence drilling and production on oil and gas leases before the expiration of their primary term, commonly three to five years, at which time the leases would terminate unless a producing well was drilled on the lease. But once production was established, the leases continued as long as oil and gas were continually produced.

Economic effects
By 2012, income from oil royalties was reportedly paying many local mineral owners $50,000 to $60,000 per month, and some more than $100,000 per month. Bruce Gjovig, head of the UND Center for Innovation Foundation in Grand Forks, estimated that the boom was creating 2,000 millionaires per year in North Dakota. By 2010, the average income in Mountrail County more than doubled to $52,027, putting the county into the top 100 richest counties in the United States.

The oil boom reduced unemployment in North Dakota to 3.5 percent in December 2011, the lowest of any state in the US.

The number of actively-drilling rigs in North Dakota peaked at 217 rigs in Spring 2012, with the rig count averaging 180-190 throughout 2013.  Each of the rigs is estimated to create roughly 125 new full-time jobs. This means a total growth of around 25,000 jobs, including an extra 10,000 jobs for workers who lay pipes to producing wells and produce processing plants. Some estimates predict that North Dakota could have as many as 48,000 new wells, with drilling taking place over the next two to three decades.

The Bakken boom propelled North Dakota into the top ranks of oil-producing states. By 2007, North Dakota ranked 8th among the states in oil production. In 2008, the state overtook Wyoming and New Mexico; in 2009 it outproduced Louisiana and Oklahoma; and in 2011 and 2012 it surpassed California and Alaska respectively. By 2012, North Dakota was exceeded only by Texas in oil production.

Government revenue
The North Dakota state government receives through severance taxes 11.5 percent of the gross value of all oil produced. The boom gave the state of North Dakota a billion-dollar budget surplus in 2011.

In addition to severance taxes, the state of North Dakota owns extensive mineral rights, which are leased by competitive bidding. In fiscal year 2010, the State Land Department reported that mineral income on its land earned $265 million for the North Dakota school trust fund, and that the trust fund had grown to $1.3 billion.

The federal government is also a major owner of mineral rights in the region, and leases the rights to companies in competitive bidding. In a January 2013 federal lease sale, the top bid was $19,500 per acre for a lease on one tract in North Dakota. Of the lease sale and royalties from the federal tracts, the federal government keeps 52 percent, and passes 48 percent on to the state of North Dakota.

Social and infrastructure effects

The industrialization and population boom put a strain on roads, water supplies, sewage systems, and government services in the area. Some counties increased in population by almost double from 20,000 to 40,000.The boom also brought with it increases in crime and social problems. The addition of thousands of oil workers led to a housing shortage, requiring the construction of man camps for housing them. Law enforcement agencies reported sharp increases in offenses, particularly violent crime, drug trafficking, gun crimes, and prostitution. The majority of these victims of sexual violence are Indigenous women. There is a prevalent perception among oilfield workers in the Bakken that there will be no consequences for assaults against Indigenous women. This exacerbates the ongoing missing and murdered Indigenous women crisis. 
These problems were similar to those found in other regions where energy industry workers took temporary jobs. There was also a shortage of police officers because pay for oil workers was two to three times higher than an officer's salary. By October 2013, the FBI's Project Safe Bakken had stationed additional full-time agents in the area.

The boom brought dramatic increases in the infrastructure of Western North Dakota. The oil boom's effect on families is the subject of the Academy Award-nominated documentary short film, White Earth.

Decline 
The oil boom in North Dakota experienced a brief decline in 2014 after the Saudi Arabian oil industry increased its output and the price of crude oil fell from $108 to $40. The price returned just as the U.S. economy recovered from the Great Recession which resulted in difficulties recruiting workers back to the region.

Resurgence 
By October 2020, total oil rig count in North Dakota had fallen. According to the North Dakota Department of Mineral Resources, the total oil rig count in the state had fallen from 58 active rigs on October 3, 2019, to only 11 active rigs on October 3, 2020, a reduction of over 80 percent. However, oil production hit an all time high of 1.5 million barrels per day in 2019. Demand fell temporarily due to Covid-19. Oil prices have since recovered to over $70 per barrel in 2021 due to increased demand linked to the Covid-19 recovery. North Dakota remains the state with the second highest oil production, after Texas.

See also
Bakken Formation
Blood & Oil, a fictional 2015 TV series that takes place in North Dakota
Keystone Pipeline
Marcellus natural gas trend
The Overnighters, a documentary film about workers in the North Dakota oil boom
Peak oil

References

Economy of North Dakota
Oil booms
2006 in North Dakota
2007 in North Dakota
2008 in North Dakota
2009 in North Dakota
2010 in North Dakota
2011 in North Dakota
2012 in North Dakota
2013 in North Dakota